Artaine Castle Shopping Centre (officially Tesco Artaine Castle Shopping Centre)  is a small shopping centre in Artane in Dublin 5, Ireland, anchored by Tesco Ireland.

Location and name
The centre is located at a roundabout on Kilmore Road, close to the site of the former Artane Industrial School.

The area’s name is spelled Artane in modern times but ArtainePlacenames Database of Ireland - Artaine and Tartaine were both used historically.

History
The centre was built by Irish property developer Rohan. It was opened in autumn 1982, with Quinnsworth and Penneys as anchor stores, along with Lifestyle Sports and Leisure and other shops, and a total of 44200 square feet of retail space and parking for up to 400 cars. The centre was the site of what was billed as "the first Banklink Service in any store in Europe" when an ATM was installed in 1986, capable of issuing vouchers which could be used for payment in the Quinnsworth branch.

Tenants
Artaine Castle's anchor stores include Tesco and Penneys, a third anchor, Lifestyle Sports, having closed in the mid-2010s. Other units include including a florists, a bookshop, post office and a McDonald at the rear of the centre. There are just under 85,000 square feet of space, 21 shops in total, and 539 parking spaces.

References

Artane, Dublin
Shopping centres in County Dublin
Buildings and structures in Dublin (city)